"For Your Boy and My Boy" is a 1918 song composed by Egbert Van Alstyne, with lyrics written by Gus Kahn and published by Jerome H. Remick & Co. The song was performed by Al Jolson and later reached No. 4 on the top 100 US songs of 1918 with a cover by the Peerless Quartet.

Cover art and analysis
The cover illustration features a soldier carrying a bayonet, with a grenade in his hand standing near a German trench ready to throw the grenade at the German soldiers.
A later cover features a soldier playing the bugle with "Lady Liberty" standing with her hands on his shoulders.

"For Your Boy and My Boy" was originally written for a Liberty Loan drive which looked to sell bonds in order to support the allied cause during World War I. It calls upon the patriotic duty of citizens to help out the soldiers over seas by buying bonds and funding the war effort. The chorus line "Ev'ry bond that we are buying will help the boys to cross the Rhine. Buy bonds, buy bonds, for your boy and mine," is repeated throughout the song to emphasize the importance of buying bonds.

See also
Liberty Bond

References

External links
Audio file of Peerless Quartet 
Cover and Sheet Music

Further reading

1918 songs
Songs of World War I
Songs with lyrics by Gus Kahn
Songs with music by Egbert Van Alstyne